"3 Little Words" is a song by British electropop singer Frankmusik from his debut studio album Complete Me, which was released on 23 November 2008 as a digital download.

Music video
The music video for the song was uploaded to YouTube on 7 October 2008.

Track listing

Release history

References

External links
Official website

2008 songs
2008 debut singles
2009 singles
Frankmusik songs
Song recordings produced by Stuart Price
Island Records singles